Myotacovirus is a subgenus of viruses in the genus Alphacoronavirus, consisting of a single species, Myotis ricketti alphacoronavirus Sax-2011.

References

Virus subgenera
Alphacoronaviruses